The national emblem of Rwanda is the national symbol and used by the government. It was restyled in 2001 to match the color scheme of the new national flag. The text reads "Republic of Rwanda - Unity, Work, Patriotism" in Kinyarwanda. The central tribal devices, a stem of sorghum, a branch of a coffee tree and a traditional basket are surmounted on a cogwheel with the sun with its rays above, while two typical Rwandan shields protects them, one on the right and one on the left. They are encircled by a square knot.

The details of the emblem are laid out in Article 3(2) of the Constitution of Rwanda.

The previous emblem dated from the 1960s-the colors green, yellow and red represented peace; the nation's hope for future development; and the people. According to the state, the device and the flag itself were changed because they had become associated with the brutality of the Rwandan genocide. However, some Rwandans at the time expressed doubts about the stated reasoning and merely viewed all this as an attempt by the ruling Rwandan Patriotic Front to express its political power by changing the state's symbols.

Gallery

References

External links
Images of the former emblems of Rwanda
National Arms and Emblems Past and Present

National symbols of Rwanda
Rwanda
Rwanda
Rwanda
Rwanda
Rwanda
Rwanda
Rwanda